Sheikh Fahd Al-Qadi (الشيخ فهد القاضي) ( - 12 November 2019) was the Saudi Arabian Islamic scholar, judge and academician who died in the prison due to acute pneumonia. He was associated with the Sahwa movement and Committee for the Promotion of Virtue and the Prevention of Vice (Saudi Arabia) Alumnus of  Imam Muhammad ibn Saud University.

In 2013, he had objected to a decision by the Saudi Minister of Education to allow female students to attend horse races.

Early life and education
Sheikh Al-Zahid Al-Abed Al-Muhtasib Abi Abdullah Fahd bin Suleiman bin Muhammad Al-Qadi was born in 1377 H in Riyadh. After graduating from high school he studied one semester in Islamic University of Madinah and then graduated from Imam Muhammad ibn Saud University.

Arrest

He was in custody since September 2016 after sending a letter of secret advice to the royal court. In October 2019, he was sentenced to six years in prison. He was arrested along with Abdulaziz al-Tarefe, Ibrahim al-Sakran and Mohammed Al-Hudaif.

Death
Al-Qadi died on 12 November in Saudi prison of pneumonia. His family blamed authorities for his death as a result of medical negligence. He was laid to rest on 13 November 2019 and a large number of people attended his funeral prayers at Al-Rajhi Mosque in Riyadh.

References

1957 births
2019 deaths
Imam Muhammad ibn Saud Islamic University alumni
Islamic University of Madinah alumni
Saudi Arabian Islamic religious leaders
Saudi Arabian prisoners and detainees
Saudi Arabian imams
Saudi Arabian Muslims
Sharia judges